Arellano University operates seven campuses in Metro Manila.

Juan Sumulong Campus (AU Main/Legarda) 
AU Manila is the Main Campus of Arellano University. It is located at Legarda Street in Sampaloc, Manila and it the largest campus by land area. It is the home to the AU Juan Sumulong High School.

Programs Offered 
FLORENTINO CAYCO MEMORIAL SCHOOL GRADUATE STUDIES

a. GRADUATE SCHOOL OF EDUCATION *(Level III Accredited by PACUCOA)

 Doctor of Education*
 Master of Arts in Education*
 Master of Arts in Psychology

b. GRADUATE SCHOOL OF NURSING (Level III Accredited by PACUCOA)

 Master of Arts in Nursing with clinical field of specialization in:
 Administration and Supervision in Nursing
 Community Health Nursing
 Maternal and Child Nursing
 Medical Surgical Nursing
 Mental Health Psychiatric Nursing
 Occupational Health Nursing

c. GRADUATE SCHOOL OF BUSINESS

 Master in Business Administration

COLLEGE OF ARTS AND SCIENCES *(Level III Accredited by PACUCOA)

 Bachelor of Arts in English, Political Science, Psychology & History*
 Bachelor of Performing Arts (Dance)

COLLEGE OF CRIMINAL JUSTICE EDUCATION

 Bachelor of Science in Criminology

SCHOOL OF EDUCATION (Level III Accredited by PACUCOA)

 Bachelor of Elementary Education*
 Special Education, Pre-School Education, General Education
 Bachelor of Secondary Education*
 Majors: Science, English, Mathematics, Filipino, Social Studies and Values Education
 Bachelor of Physical Education - Sports & Wellness Management
 Bachelor of Physical Education
 Bachelor of Library and Information Science
 Teacher Certificate Program (TCP)

EXPANDED TERTIARY EDUCATION EQUIVALENCY AND ACCREDITATION PROGRAM (ETEEAP)

 Bachelor of Science in Nursing (Level III PACUCOA Accredited)
 Bachelor of Arts (Level III PACUCOA Accredited)
 Bachelor of Secondary Education (Level III PACUCOA Accredited)

INTERNATIONAL NURSING PROGRAM

 Arellano University and Edith Cowan University, Perth Western Australia International Nursing Program
 Arellano University and Alderson Broaddus College Philippi, WV, USA International Nursing Program

COLLEGE OF NURSING (Level III Accredited by PACUCOA)

 Bachelor of Science in Nursing

COLLEGE OF ALLIED MEDICAL SERVICES

 Bachelor of Science in Physical Therapy
 Bachelor of Science in Radiologic Technology Click to see more details...
 Bachelor of Science Medical Technology/ Medical Laboratory Science Click to see more details...
 Bachelor of Science in Pharmacy Click to see more details...
 Bachelor of Science in Psychology
 Bachelor of Science in Midwifery; Diploma in Midwifery

SCHOOL OF COMPUTER SCIENCE (Level III Accredited by PACUCOA)

 Bachelor of Science in Computer Science
 Majors: Software Technology  Information Technology and Multimedia Technology

INSTITUTE OF ACCOUNTANCY

 Bachelor of Science in Accountancy
 Bachelor of Science in Accounting Information Systems

SCHOOL OF BUSINESS AND ADMINISTRATION (Level III Accredited by PACUCOA)

 Bachelor of Science in Business Administration
 Majors: Marketing Management, Financial Management, Operations and Logistics Management, Human Resource Development Management

SCHOOL OF HOSPITALITY AND TOURISM MANAGEMENT (Level III Accredited by PACUCOA)

 Bachelor of Science in Hospitality Management
 Bachelor of Science in Tourism Management

TESDA RECOGNIZED COURSES (Short Term)

 Bread and Pastry Production (NC II)
 Cookery (NC II)
 Food and Beverage Services (NC II)
 Finishing Course for Legal Transcription
 Performing Arts Song
 Health Care Services (NC II)
 Caregiving (NC II)
 Medical Transcription

JUAN SUMULONG BASIC EDUCATION SENIOR HIGH SCHOOL PROGRAM FOR GRADES 11 AND 12

ACADEMIC TRACK

 HUMSS - Humanities and Social Sciences
 STEM - Science, Technology, Engineering and Mathematics
 GAS - General Academics
 ABM - Accountancy, Business and Management

TECHNICAL-VOCATIONAL-LIVELIHOOD (TVL) TRACK

 Home Economics - (Food & Beverage Services, Bread and Pastry Production, Housekeeping, Cookery, Caregiving, Tour Guiding Services, Bartending, Tourism Promotion Services, Hairdressing, Attraction and Theme Parks, Tailoring, Handicraft)
 Agri-Fishery Arts - (Horticulture, Landscape Installation and Maintenance, Organic Agriculture Production, Pest Management, Rice Machinery Operation, Animal Production, Artificial Insemination-Large Ruminants, Artificial Insemination-Swine, Slaughtering, Fish Nursery Operation, Fish or Shrimp Grow-out Operation, Fishport/Wharf Operation, Fish Processing)
 Industrial Arts - (Automotive Servicing, Refrigeration and Air-Conditioning Servicing, Consumer Electronics Servicing, Electrical Installation and Maintenance, Shielded Metal Arc Welding, Carpentry, Plumbing, Tile Setting)
 Information and Communication Technology - (Computer Programming, Animation)
 Information, Communication and Technology - (Medical Transcription)

SPORTS TRACK

 Coaching and Sports Officiating

ARTS AND DESIGN TRACK

 Performing Arts (Music and Dance)

JUNIOR HIGH SCHOOL (Grades 7-10) (Level II Accredited by PACUCOA)

ELEMENTARY DEPARTMENT (Grades 1-6) (Level II Accredited by PACUCOA)

PRE-SCHOOL DEPARTMENT 

 Nursery
 Kindergarten
 Preparatory

Jose Abad Santos Campus (AU Pasay) 
The campus of AU in Pasay is officially known as Arellano University – José Abad Santos Campus (AUJASC). It is located along Taft Avenue in Pasay near the LRT-1 Gil Puyat Station. It was established in 1945 as the José Abad Santos High School. The campus was named after José Abad Santos y Basco, the fifth Chief Justice of the Supreme Court of the Philippines who also served as the acting President of the Philippines during World War II until executed by the Japanese invading forces. In 1986, the Colleges of the nearby Apolinario Mabini Campus transferred to this campus, with the exception of the School of Law.

Programs Offered 
COLLEGE OF NURSING (Level II Accredited by PACUCOA)

 Bachelor of Science in Nursing

COLLEGE OF MEDICAL LABORATORY SCIENCE

 Bachelor of Science in Medical Technology (BSMT)

COLLEGE OF ARTS AND SCIENCES (Level II Accredited by PACUCOA)

 Bachelor of Arts in English
 Bachelor of Arts in Psychology
 Bachelor of Arts in Political Science
 Bachelor of Arts in History

SCHOOL OF EDUCATION (Level II Accredited by PACUCOA)

 Bachelor of Elementary Education (General Education)
 Bachelor of Secondary Education
 Majors: English, Mathematics, Filipino, Science, Social Science, Values Education, Physical Education

SCHOOL OF HOSPITALITY AND TOURISM MANAGEMENT

 Bachelor of Science in Hospitality Management (BSHM)
 Bachelor of Science in Tourism Management (BSTM)

SCHOOL OF BUSINESS AND COMMERCE

 Bachelor of Science in Business Administration (BSBA) Major in:
 Marketing Management
 Management Accounting
 Financial Management
 Business Management
 Human Resource Development Management
 Bachelor of Science in Accounting Information System (BSAIS)

SCHOOL OF INFORMATION TECHNOLOGY

 Bachelor of Science in Computer Science (BSCS)
 Bachelor of Science in Information Technology (BSIT)
 Bachelor of Science in Information System (BSIS)

JOSE ABAD SANTOS CAMPUS BASIC EDUCATION SENIOR HIGH SCHOOL PROGRAM FOR GRADES 11 AND 12

ACADEMIC TRACK

 HUMSS - Humanities and Social Sciences
 STEM - Science, Technology, Engineering and Mathematics
 GAS - General Academics
 ABM - Accountancy, Business and Management

TECHNICAL-VOCATIONAL-LIVELIHOOD (TVL) TRACK

 Home Economics - (Food & Beverage Services, Bread and Pastry Production, Housekeeping, Caregiving, Tour Guiding Services, Tourism Promotion Services, Bartending)  
 Information and Communications Technology - (Computer Programming, Animation)

JUNIOR HIGH SCHOOL (Grades 7-10)  (Level II Accredited by PACUCOA)

ELEMENTARY DEPARTMENT (Grades 1-6) 

PRE-SCHOOL DEPARTMENT 

 Nursery
 Kindergarten
 Preparatory

Campuses

Manila

AU Manila is the Main Campus of Arellano University. It is located at Legarda Street in Sampaloc, Manila and it the largest campus by landa area. It is the home to the AU Juan Sumulong High School.

Pasig

AU in Pasig was officially known as Arellano University – Andres Bonifacio Campus (AU-ABC) and the campus was named after Andrés Bonifacio y de Castro, a Filipino nationalist and revolutionary. It is located in Caniogan, Pasig.

Pasay

The campus of AU in Pasay is officially known as Arellano University – José Abad Santos Campus (AUJASC). It is located along Taft Avenue in Pasay near the LRT-1 Gil Puyat Station. It was established in 1945 as the José Abad Santos High School. The campus was named after José Abad Santos y Basco, the fifth Chief Justice of the Supreme Court of the Philippines who also served as the acting President of the Philippines during World War II until executed by the Japanese invading forces. In 1986, the Colleges of the nearby Apolinario Mabini Campus transferred to this campus, with the exception of the School of Law.

Menlo, Pasay

The campus of AU located in Menlo, Pasay is the campus of the School of Law. Formerly, it has other colleges that were transferred to the nearby Abad Santos Campus. Aside from the School of Law, the campus has a Junior and Senior High School. The campus was named after Apolinario Mabini, the sublime paralytic.

Malabon

AU in Malabon is composed of two campuses, the Elisa Esguerra Campus and the Jose Rizal Campus. Jose Rizal is located along Gov. Pascual Avenue, while the Elisa Esguerra Campus is located in Bayan-Bayanan a couple of city blocks further north of Jose Rizal Campus. It is composed of a Preschool, Elementary School, Junior and Senior High School, the School of Business and Commerce, School of Education, School of Hospitality and Tourism Management and the Institute of Arts and Sciences. Notable people from AU Malabon include Norberto B. Gonzales, who served as the 34th Secretary of the Department of National Defense, Dionisio Santiago,  former head of the Philippine Drug Enforcement Agency and the Dangerous Drug Board, Cheryl Oliveros, a candidate of Bb. Pilipinas 2009, and Bayani Agbayani, an actor and comedian.

Mandaluyong

AU established a campus in Mandaluyong on 1950, upon the request of high school students studying in AU Manila but are residents of Mandaluyong. The campus was officially known as Arellano University – Plaridel Campus (AUPC). It is located at Gen. Kalentong Street in Barangay Pag-Asa. The campus was named after the pen-name of Marcelo H. del Pilar, a leading propagandist of the Philippine Revolution. AUPC has a Preschool, Elementary School, Junior and Senior High School and is composed of the College of Arts and Sciences, College of Criminology, School of Education, School of Hospital and Tourism Management, and the School of Computer Science.

Defunct Campus

F.G. Calderon Campus

Located in Santa Ana, Manila, all records of F.G. Calderon Campus were transferred to Plaridel Campus when it was closed in the late 1960s. At present, high-rise residential towers occupies the site.

References

External links

 Arellano University - Official website

Arellano University
Educational institutions established in 1945
Educational institutions established in 1950
Educational institutions established in 1978
1945 establishments in the Philippines
1950 establishments in the Philippines
1978 establishments in the Philippines